Douyu may refer to:

 DouYu, a Chinese video live streaming service.
 Douyu (town), a town in Luancheng District, Shijiazhuang, Hebei province, China.